Édgar or Edgard Anthony Álvarez Reyes (born 9 January 1980 in Puerto Cortés) is a Honduran former soccer player who last played for Platense in the Liga Nacional de Fútbol de Honduras.

He could play anywhere on the right flank.

Club career

Club Atlético Peñarol
Nicknamed El Mosky or El Jet Álvarez (The Jet Alvarez), he was linked to the Uruguayan club when he was 24. Uruguayan Peñarol was champion in 2003 after winning the Clausura finals against Nacional and hand coach Diego Aguirre. In that team unquestioned right side Honduran Edgar Alvarez was, who had come to the club after playing seven seasons at Deportivo Platense in his country. The player was considered by Diego Aguirre as important in his scheme.

A.S. Roma
After a successful loan period, A.S. Roma paid €1.5 million to Peñarol, but immediately loaned him to Messina and granted the club an option to buy him for €1.9 million. He signed a 5-year contract.

After spending the 2006–07 season at Messina Álvarez returned to Roma. At the summer transfer period AS Roma bought Mauro Esposito and Álvarez decided to leave Roma for Livorno, who maintained an option to buy him for  €2 million. He left Roma due to the surplus of right midfielders.
After spending the 2007–08 season at Livorno, Alvarez returned to Roma, and spent a full pre-season with the club, But he was loaned for the 2008–09 season to Pisa on 1 September 2008.

F.C. Bari 1908
In 2009, he moved to Bari, on a permanent basis. The first year with the pugliesi turned out well. Under the guidance of Giampiero Ventura Álvarez became one of the best wings in Serie A. The second year did not turn out as well though and the club finished the season in last, moving to Serie B. Over two years Álvarez played in 65 league games, scoring 4 goals.

U.S. Città di Palermo
On 31 August 2011 Álvarez moved to Palermo as the player agreed to a two-year contract with the club.

FC Dinamo București
In July 2012, he moved to Liga I side Dinamo București and later signed a one-year contract with the Romanian side. He played only five games for Dinamo, his evolution being marred by his injuries. His contract was ended by mutual consent in December 2012.

Playing style
Álvarez is known for his searing pace and acceleration, both on and off the ball. He is also very agile, making him very difficult for defenders to mark.

International career
Álvarez played at the 1999 World Youth Cup and made his senior debut for Honduras in a 2001 UNCAF Nations Cup match against Panama, coming on as a second-half substitute for Mauricio Sabillón. As of July 2012, has earned 51 caps, scoring 3 goals. He has represented his country in 10 FIFA World Cup qualification matches and played at the 2001 and 2003 UNCAF Nations Cups as well as at the 2003 and 2007 CONCACAF Gold Cups. But most importantly, he was part of the 2010 FIFA World Cup squad and played in two matches.

International goals
Scores and results list Honduras' goal tally first.

Honours and awards

Club
Peñarol
Uruguayan Primera División (1): 2003

C.D. Platense
Liga Nacional de Fútbol Profesional de Honduras (1): 2000–01
Honduran Cup (2): 1996, 1997

References

External links

1980 births
Living people
People from Puerto Cortés
Honduran footballers
Honduran expatriate footballers
Honduran expatriate sportspeople in Italy
Honduras international footballers
2001 UNCAF Nations Cup players
2003 UNCAF Nations Cup players
2003 CONCACAF Gold Cup players
2007 CONCACAF Gold Cup players
2010 FIFA World Cup players
Platense F.C. players
Peñarol players
Cagliari Calcio players
A.S. Roma players
A.C.R. Messina players
U.S. Livorno 1915 players
Pisa S.C. players
S.S.C. Bari players
Palermo F.C. players
FC Dinamo București players
Liga Nacional de Fútbol Profesional de Honduras players
Uruguayan Primera División players
Serie A players
Serie B players
Liga I players
Expatriate footballers in Italy
Expatriate footballers in Uruguay
Expatriate footballers in Romania
Association football wingers